Pteridinium is an erniettomorph found in a number of Precambrian deposits worldwide. It is a member of the Ediacaran biota.

Body plan
The three-lobed body is generally flat such that only two lobes are visible. Each lobe consists of a number of parallel ribs extending back to the main axis where the three lobes come together. Even on well-preserved specimens, there is no sign of a mouth, anus, eyes, legs, antennae, or any other appendages or organs.  The organism grew primarily by the addition of new units, probably at both ends, with the inflation of existing units contributing little to its growth.

Ecology
Specimens found in what is thought to be life positions indicate that the creature rested on — or possibly in — the sediment in shallow seas. No tracks are known that would seem to be consistent with a moving Pteridinium. It is unclear whether it performed photosynthesis, or osmotically extracted nutrients from seawater.

Occurrence
Fossils are common in late Precambrian deposits in South Australia, Namibia, and the White Sea region of Russia. It has also been found in North Carolina and is reported from California and the Northwest Territories of Canada.

History
Pteridium simplex was originally described by Georg Gürich in 1930 published in Zeitschrift der Deutschen Geologischen Gesellschaft vol.82 p. 637.  Pteridium was already used back in 1777 by Scopoli as the generic name for bracken fern, and so it was changed to "Pteridinium" in 1933.

Two Pteridinium specimens were found in North Carolina in 1963 by a high school student named John Brattain. After their discovery, they were misidentified by Joseph St. Jean from the UNC Geology Department as Cambrian trilobites, and were classified as "Paradoxides carolinaensis", until they were discovered to be a species of Pteridinium.

It was originally thought that Pteridinium might be a primitive Cnidarian, but it appears that it is, at best, only very distantly related to any known cnidarian. Its relation to other known Ediacaran biota is not clear. There are no identified related forms, although there is some vague resemblance to other Ediacaran forms such as Dickinsonia and Spriggina that share some of its enigmatic characteristics, such as the "staggered" or glide symmetry of its units, or triradial symmetry otherwise only seen in trilobozoans like Tribrachidium. Pteridinium has no known descendants.

Further reading

See also
 List of Ediacaran genera

References

External links
 Vendian Animals: Pteridinium, at University of California Museum of Paleontology
 Photograph

Ediacaran life
White Sea fossils
Prehistoric animal genera